Sanru Dam  is a trapezoidal dam located in Hokkaido Prefecture in Japan. The dam is used for flood control, water supply and power production. The catchment area of the dam is 182.5 km2. The dam impounds about 380  ha of land when full and can store 57200 thousand cubic meters of water. The construction of the dam was started on 1988 and completed in 2018.

References

Dams in Hokkaido